Niklas Kohrt (born 21 March 1980 in Luckenwalde, Bezirk Potsdam) is a German actor.

Life 
Niklas Kohrt spent his childhood and youth in Berlin]. In 1999 he got his "Abitur" at the Karl-Schiller-Oberschule and began his one-year national service in a hospital.

In October 2000 he started studying culture-, politics- and theater science at the  Humboldt-Universität zu Berlin first. After two years he stopped his studies to study at the renomated Hochschule für Schauspielkunst „Ernst Busch“ Berlin. During his studies for acting he was engaged for the role of Keith in Lars Norens play Kälte in 2004, which played at the Deutschen Theater in Berlin. In the season 2005/2006 Niklas Kohrt became a member of the theater ensemble at the Deutsches Theater and has been acting in several plays so far. He also acted in several films for cinema (recently Teenage Angst).

In 2008 he received the Alfred-Kerr-Darstellerpreis des Berliner Theatertreffens for his performance in Gerhart Hauptmanns Die Ratten  as Bruno Mechelke. A little later he was chosen as best newcomer ( bester Nachwuchsschauspieler) by the committee of the magazine Theater heute for the same role.

Beginning with season 2009/2010 Niklas Kohrt became a member of the theater ensemble at the das Schauspielhaus Zürich, as guest actor he was taking part in several plays at the Deutsches Theater in Berlin.

Theater

Deutsches Theater Berlin 
 2004: Kälte (Lars Noren / director: Robert Schuster / role: Keith)
 2005: The Confusions of Young Törless (Robert Musil / director: Dušan David Parizek / role: Reiting)
 2005: Tartuffe (Molière / director: Robert Schuster / role: Damis)
 2006: Auf der Greifswalder Straße (Roland Schimmelpfennig / director: Jürgen Gosch / role: Fritz)
 2006: Schlaf (Jon Fosse / director: Michael Thalheimer / role: erster junger Mann)
 2007: Das Reich der Tiere (Roland Schimmelpfennig / director: Jürgen Gosch / role: Chris)
 2007: A Midsummer Night's Dream (Ein Sommernachtstraum, German version) (William Shakespeare / director: Jürgen Gosch / role: Lysander)
 2007: Die Ratten (Gerhart Hauptmann / director: Michael Thalheimer / role: Bruno Mechelke)
 2007: Triumph der Liebe (Pierre Carlet de Marivaux / director: Barbara Frey / role: Gärtner)
 2008: Roberto Zucco (Bernard-Marie Koltès / director: Jakob Fedler / role: Zucco)
 2008: Was ihr wollt (William Shakespeare / director: Michael Thalheimer / role: Sir Andrew Bleichenwang)
 2008: My Own Private Germany (director: Robert Borgmann / role: Christian)
 2009: True West (Sam Shepard / director: Sabine Auf der Heyde / role: Austin)
 2009: Idomeneus (Roland Schimmelpfennig / director: Jürgen Gosch)

Schauspielhaus Zürich
 2009: Martin Salander (Thomas Jonigk after the novel by Gottfried Keller / director: Stefan Bachmann / role: Arnold)
 2009: Triumph der Liebe (Pierre Carlet de Marivaux / Regie: Barbara Frey / role: Gärtner)
 2009: Der Revisor (Nikolaj Gogol / Regie: Sebastian Nübling / role: police man)
 2010: Der Hofmeister (Jakob Michael Reinhold Lenz / director: Frank Castorf / role: Läuffer)

Filmography

Television 
 1992: Achterbahn – Unter Verdacht (Rollercoaster - Under Suspicion) (ZDF / director: Gabi Degener)

Cinema
 1995: Das Versteck (The Hiding Place) (dffb-short film / Regie: Saskia Kuipers)
 2003: Ganga Guest House (dffb-short film / director: David Sieveking)
 2004: Muxmäuschenstill (director: Marcus Mittermeier)
 2005: Mein ganz gewöhnliches Leben (My ordinary life) (director: Dominik Bechtel)
 2006: Tough Enough (director: Detlev Buck)
 2008: Teenage Angst (director: Thomas Stuber)
 2011:  (director: Hans Steinbichler)

Awards
 2008: Alfred-Kerr-Darstellerpreis of the "Berliner Theatertreffen" for the role of Bruno Mechelke in Die Ratten
 2008: Nachwuchsschauspieler des Jahres, chosen by the Jury of the magazine Theater heute

References

External links
 
 Niklas Kohrt on the website Homepage of Schauspielhaus Zürich
 Agentur Splanemann

1980 births
Living people
People from Luckenwalde
People from Bezirk Potsdam
German male television actors
German male stage actors
German male film actors
Ernst Busch Academy of Dramatic Arts alumni